Three referendums were held in Switzerland in 1989. The first was held on 4 June on a popular initiative "for nature-oriented farming—against animal factories", which was rejected by voters. The second and third were held on 26 November on popular initiatives "for a Switzerland without army and a comprehensive policy of peace" and on introducing 130 and 100 kilometres per hour speed limits, both of which were rejected.

Results

June: Agriculture

November: Abolishing the army

November: Speed limits

References

1989 referendums
1989 in Switzerland
Referendums in Switzerland
Conscription referendums